The Mason Transit Authority (MTA), formerly the Mason County Transportation Authority, is the public transit authority of Mason County, Washington, United States. It operates free bus service within the county, connecting the city of Shelton, Hoodsport, Grapeview, Allyn, Belfair, the native tribal reservations of the Skokomish and Squaxin people, and paid commuter service to Olympia in Thurston County, Brinnon in Jefferson County, and Bremerton in Kitsap County. The agency also provides general public dial-a-ride service, operates a vanpool fleet, a worker/driver program that provides commuter service to the Puget Sound Naval Shipyard and Intermediate Maintenance Facility, volunteer driver program for senior transportation, a supplemental service that is an after school activity bus and a community van program.

History

Public transit in Mason County was conceived with the establishment of a public transportation benefit area (PTBA) on September 22, 1987. After two unsuccessful attempts at approving the PTBA in 1985 and 1988, a countywide vote on November 15, 1991 approved the Mason County Public Transportation Benefit Area and a sales tax of 0.2% to fund public transportation. Buses began operating on December 1, 1992.

The Mason County Transit Authority officially changed its name to Mason Transit Authority in 2013.

In 2015, the agency was named the Rural Transit System of the Year by the Community Transit Association of America, citing the completion of the county's transit-community center.

Facilities

Transit-Community Center

The Transit-Community Center is a combined community center and transit center located in Shelton that opened on April 1, 2015. It was originally a Washington National Guard armory built in the 1950s that was purchased by the MTA in 2006 and renovated at a cost of $9.9 million, funded by local sales tax and funding from the Federal Transit Administration.

Services

Fares

Routes

Connecting services

Kitsap Transit and Washington State Ferries in Bremerton (via route 3)
Intercity Transit, Grays Harbor Transit and Sound Transit Express in Olympia (via route 6)
Squaxin Transit in Kamilche (via route 6)
Jefferson Transit in Brinnon (via route 8)

Fleet

Current Bus Fleet

References

External links

Bus transportation in Washington (state)
Transit agencies in Washington (state)
Transportation in Mason County, Washington